Rui Miguel Ferreira Neto Sacramento (born 31 January 1985) is a Portuguese former professional footballer who played as a goalkeeper.

Club career
Born in Matosinhos, Sacramento joined FC Porto's youth system at the age of 15. He went on to make his senior debut with FC Porto B and C.A. Valdevez, with both teams in the third division (he also spent the 2006–07 season with Valdevez in the fourth).

From 2008 to 2013, Sacramento alternated between the Segunda Liga and the third tier, representing Gil Vicente FC, S.C. Esmoriz, C.D. Feirense, A.D. Camacha, C.D. Cinfães and Leixões SC. With the latter club, he only missed one match out of a possible 42 in the 2012–13 campaign in a third-place finish in the latter league.

Sacramento signed for newly promoted Primeira Liga side F.C. Arouca in the summer of 2013. He made his debut in the competition on 25 August, in a 1–2 home loss against G.D. Estoril Praia.

References

External links

1985 births
Living people
Sportspeople from Matosinhos
Portuguese footballers
Association football goalkeepers
Primeira Liga players
Liga Portugal 2 players
Segunda Divisão players
FC Porto B players
Gil Vicente F.C. players
C.D. Feirense players
C.D. Cinfães players
Leixões S.C. players
F.C. Arouca players
AD Oliveirense players
F.C. Pedras Rubras players
Portugal youth international footballers